Nathanael "Nathan" Abbey (born 11 July 1978) is an English journeyman former professional footballer who played as a goalkeeper.

Career

Luton Town
Nathanael Abbey was born on 11 July 1978 in Islington, London, and began his football career as a trainee with Luton Town, turning professional in August 1995. His first team debut came on 26 August 1997 in the League Cup first round second leg tie at home to Colchester United, a 1–1 draw taking the Hatters into the second round. Later that season he had a spell on loan to Football Conference side Woking. He had to wait until January 1999 for this next first team appearance for Luton, playing in the 3–0 defeat at home to Walsall in the Football League Trophy. His league debut came the following month, on 6 February, playing in the 2–1 win away to Burnley.

Abbey began the 1999–2000 season as Luton's first choice goalkeeper, previous first choice Kelvin Davis having been sold to Wimbledon to aid Luton's financial problems, and remained a regular throughout the season. In the summer of 2000, Luton manager Ricky Hill signed Mark Ovendale and chose him to start the season in place of him. However, Abbey soon regained his place in the side, though spent most of the season in and out of the side as first Lil Fuccillo and then Joe Kinnear took over as Luton manager.

Chesterfield
With Luton relegated to the bottom flight of the Football League, Abbey was released by Luton and joined Chesterfield in August 2001. He was an ever-present the following season and won the Chesterfield Player of the Year Award, but left after failing to agree a new contract.

Non-league
He joined Northampton Town in August 2002 and signed a contract extension until the end of the season, but struggled to establish himself and was released at the end of the season having played only eight games. He returned to Luton on trial, but signed for Conference side Stevenage Borough in July 2003. He played six Conference games before returning to Luton Town in October 2003. He was released by Luton manager Mike Newell the following month, joining Macclesfield Town, where he again failed to make the first team and was released, joining non-league Hayes in December 2003. Abbey had similar experiences on moving to Ipswich Town later the same month and Burnley in January 2004.

Boston United
In July 2004, Abbey signed for Boston United, playing 61 league games over the next season and a half. He had a spell on loan with Leyton Orient in December 2005 and moved to Bristol City on a free transfer in February 2006 after being released by Boston at the end of January. He made just one appearance for City, as a substitute for Adriano Basso in the 1–0 defeat away to Southend United on 6 May 2005, before being released at the end of the season.

Torquay United
He signed for Torquay United in July 2006 and was soon installed as first choice goalkeeper by Torquay manager Ian Atkins. Despite being ever-present in the Torquay goal from the start of the 2006–07 season, Abbey was only offered a one-month extension to his existing six-month contract and left the club at the end of his contract on 28 December 2006. His last game for Torquay came on 26 December 2006 at home to Milton Keynes Dons, where Torquay manager Lubos Kubik decided to substitute him for debutant keeper Martin Horsell with seven minutes of the game remaining and Torquay 2–0 down.

Brentford
Abbey signed for Brentford on 29 December 2006 on an emergency loan as regular goalkeepers Stuart Nelson and Clark Masters were injured. He signed a permanent contract on 26 January 2007. He made sixteen appearances for the Bees before being released on 16 May 2007.

Milton Keynes Dons
He signed for Milton Keynes Dons shortly before the start of the 2007–08 season. He made his debut for MK Dons coming on as a sub against Cheltenham Town when regular keeper Willy Gueret was sent off. After two seasons he was released by MK Dons.

Return to non-league
He joined Rushden & Diamonds making eleven appearances for the club. In January 2010 he joined Kettering Town on a non-contract basis. It was announced on 16 November 2010 that Abbey had been sacked from Kettering Town due to gross misconduct, having made 29 appearances for the club.

Managerial career
Abbey joined his brother Zema as player/assistant manager at Arlesey Town. In November 2013, Abbey moved with his brother to St Neots Town. Abbey left the club at the same time as his brother a couple of months into the 2014–15 season, with Gary King assuming sole control of the first team. Abbey soon joined Dunstable Town in late 2014. In February 2015, he returned to Arlesey Town as player-joint manager alongside his brother. The two left the club in May 2018.

In the summer 2018, Abbey joined Bedford Town both as a player and as an assistant coach, monitoring the match analysis. Ahead of the 2019–20 season, Abbey was promoted to joint-head coach alongside Jon Taylor. On 3 November 2019, Taylor decided to step back and Abbey agreed to take on the role by himself. However, he decided to step back on 14 January 2020 after a disappointing run of form since he took charge of the team.

In December 2021 it was announced that Bedford FC had been sold to new owner Peter McCormack. The club team, now known as Real Bedford, is currently managed by Nathan Abbey as it continues its season in the Spartan South Midlands Football League.

Personal life
His brother, Zema, was also a professional footballer.

Career statistics

Honours
Milton Keynes Dons
Football League Trophy: 2008

References

External links 
 
 
 
 Nathan Abbey – Basingstoke Town Profile

1978 births
Living people
Footballers from Islington (district)
Association football goalkeepers
Black British sportsmen
National League (English football) players
English footballers
English Football League players
Southern Football League players
Boston United F.C. players
Brentford F.C. players
Bristol City F.C. players
Burnley F.C. players
Chesterfield F.C. players
Ipswich Town F.C. players
Leyton Orient F.C. players
Luton Town F.C. players
Milton Keynes Dons F.C. players
Rushden & Diamonds F.C. players
Northampton Town F.C. players
Stevenage F.C. players
Torquay United F.C. players
Woking F.C. players
Hayes F.C. players
Arlesey Town F.C. players
St Albans City F.C. players
Kettering Town F.C. players
St Neots Town F.C. players
Dunstable Town F.C. players
English football managers
Arlesey Town F.C. managers
English people of Ghanaian descent
English people of Saint Vincent and the Grenadines descent